is a Japanese game scriptwriter and novelist from Aichi, Japan.

Works
Bakumatsu Renka Shinsen Gumi
Meine Liebe II
Memories Off 2nd
Nasare Hina no Asa

Novelizations 
Moon
One: Kagayaku Kisetsu e
Tsui no Sora

External links
LiQUid rED 
granat stealth 

Japanese writers
Living people
Year of birth missing (living people)